The MS UND Adriyatik is a RO-RO freighter owned by the Turkish company U.N Ro-Ro İşletmeleri A.Ş. It went into service on 1 September 2001, after being built in the Flensburger Schiffbau Gesellschaft (FSG) shipyard in Flensburg, Germany. It was used for transporting goods between Pendik (Istanbul), Turkey and Trieste, Italy. UND Adriyatik  caught fire on 6 February 2008 off the coast of Istria, Croatia, just outside Croatian territorial waters.

Fire and salvaging operations timeline
An SOS was launched at 4:04 local time. The ship's 22 crew members and nine passengers were rescued by the Greek ship Ikarus Palace that was sailing nearby and were on their way to Venice.

An official said Croatian fire-fighting planes and one tug boat arrived soon at the scene and were trying to extinguish the blaze. The planes were quickly withdrawn as they had no effect. As the fire started inside the ship, there was no way of extinguishing it from the outside. However, tug boats continued to pour water on the ship's hull, in an effort to lower its temperature and prevent its deformation. 

There were fears of an explosion if the fire was to reach the fuel tanks. Also, the water currents were pushing the ship towards the Croatian coast. Floating barrages were placed around the ship, but no oil leaked.

At that time Croatian officials still hoped that strong east winds would push the ship out of their territorial sea, but instead the ship approached Pula, the largest city on Istra peninsula. According to Croatian sources, the fire was under control and there was no further threat of an ecological disaster. Several maritime fire-fighting specialists from the Netherlands arrived on the scene (after long check-in procedure on a Pula airport, because airport official demanded papers for their special equipment) but were unable to board the ship. Those firefighters worked for Smit International and were hired by the ship's owning company and were known for their role in the salvaging operations of the Russian submarine Kursk. The ship salvage phase was documented on the National Geographic Channel's Salvage Code Red program.

The specialists from the Netherlands were at last able to board the ship on 8 February, when they extinguished the blaze completely and then the ship could be towed to a harbour. Negotiations were underway as to which port to tow the ship. Several sources reported the most probable destination was the Italian port of Trieste though some media reported that the port authorities of Trieste have declined this option.

The ship remained 5 mi off Pula until 17 February, when Italian tugboats began pulling it towards Trieste. Reportedly, the Norwegian classification organisation Det Norske Veritas confirmed all security measures were in place to allow that. On 19 February it arrived in Trieste.

On 2 February 2009 the ship was towed to the "Beşiktaş Gemi Inşa" shipyard in Yalova, Turkey, for future repairs at the shipyard's 235 x 38 meters drydock. On 13 March 2009 it was reported that the length of the ship will be extended, following the one year-long repairs, by an additional 30 meters (to the total of 223 meters).

References

External links

Ship details:
Ferry-site
Caterpillar Marine Power Systems
News reports:
Croatia contains cargo ship fire (BBC)
CNN Türk report 

Photos and videos:
Video of the ship in flames 
Photos of the burning ship 

Maritime incidents in 2008
Transport disasters in Croatia
Cargo ships of Turkey
Ship fires
2001 ships
Ships built in Flensburg
2008 disasters in Croatia